Felsenthal may refer to:

People
Bernhard Felsenthal (1822–1908), German-American rabbi
Edward Felsenthal (born 1966), American journalist
Francine Felsenthal (1922–2000), American artist
Julia I. Felsenthal (1867–1954), American social worker

Other
Felsenthal, Arkansas
Felsenthal National Wildlife Refuge